Pfahlbaumuseum Unteruhldingen (German for 'Stilt house museum') is an archaeological open-air museum on Lake Constance  (Bodensee) in  Unteruhldingen, Germany, consisting of reconstructions of stilt houses or lake dwellings from the Neolithic and Bronze Age.

Museum
The museum consists of a number of exhibits displaying archeological finds from the area and period.

Reconstructions
The archaeological open-air museum is laid out over a large area with reconstructions of lake pile dwellings from 4000 BC to 850 BC. The museum was opened in 1922 with various reconstructions being added up until the present day.

Stone age houses “Riedschachen/Schussenried”

In 1922, the first two stilt houses were erected. They are based on archaeological excavations in a bog close to the Federsee near Bad Schussenried in 1920 where remains of a Neolithic settlement of 4000 BC were found.

Bronze age village “Bad Buchau”
Is an idealistic reconstruction of late Bronze Age buildings on a platform, built between 1923 and 1931.

Stone age village “Sipplingen”
Built between 1938 and 1940 based on early stone age stilt dwellings.

“Hornstaad-House” and “Arbon-House”
Stone age reconstructions built between 1996 and 1998.

Bronze age village “Unteruhldingen”

A number of dwellings built between 1999 and 2002.

SWR Stone Age village
Building moved to the site, originally used in the TV program “Steinzeit - Das Experiment. Leben wie vor 5000 Jahren”

See also
 Prehistoric pile dwellings around the Alps
 Post in ground
 Neolithic Europe
 Bronze Age Europe
 Urnfield culture

References

External links 

 Pfahlbauten open-air museum

Bodenseekreis
Archaeological sites in Germany
Vernacular architecture
Open-air museums in Germany
Stilt houses